The 1955–56 IHL season was the 11th season of the International Hockey League, a North American minor professional league. Six teams participated in the regular season, and the Cincinnati Mohawks won the Turner Cup.

Regular season

Turner Cup-Playoffs

Turner Cup playoffs

Semifinals
Cincinnati Mohawks 3, Fort Wayne Komets 1

Toledo-Marion Mercurys 3, Troy Bruins 2

Turner Cup Finals
Cincinnati Mohawks 4, Toledo-Marion Mercurys 0

Awards

Coaches
Cincinnati Mohawks: Rollie McLenahan
Fort Wayne Komets: Doug McCaig
Grand Rapids Rockets: N/A
Indianapolis Chiefs John Sorrell, Leo Lamoureux
Toledo-Marion Mercurys: Butch Stahan
Troy Bruins: Nels Podolsky

References

Attendance Figures - Cincinnati Enquirer 03-16-1956 through 03-30-1956

External links
 Season 1955/56 on hockeydb.com

IHL
International Hockey League (1945–2001) seasons